The men's 3000 metres event  at the 1973 European Athletics Indoor Championships was held on 10 and 11 March in Rotterdam.

Medalists

Results

Heats
Held on 10 March.

First 3 from each heat (Q) and the next 2 fastest (q) qualified for the final.

Final
Held on 11 March.

References

3000 metres at the European Athletics Indoor Championships
3000